The Cracăul Alb is a river in the Vânători-Neamț Natural Park in Neamț County, Romania. At its confluence with the Cracăul Negru in Magazia, the river Cracău is formed.

Tributaries

The following rivers are tributaries to the river Cracăul Alb (from source to mouth):

Left: Bilbor, Pietrosu, Sofica, Pârâul Platonești, Bolătău, Izvorul Alb, Pârâul Adânc
Right: Alunul, Pârâul Popii, Frasinu, Bouleț

References

External links
 Tourist map, Parcul Vânători-Neamț

Rivers of Romania
Rivers of Neamț County